Muktesvara Temple is a Hindu temple in the town of Kanchipuram in Tamil Nadu, India. Dedicated to Shiva, the temple was constructed by the Pallavas and has inscriptions dating back to the time of Nandivarman II.

Nearest Hindu Temple
Arulmigu Thirumagaraleeswar Temple, Magaral

References

External links
  Muktheeswara temple

 

Hindu temples in Kanchipuram
Shiva temples in Kanchipuram district